The Cappella Istropolitana is a Slovak chamber orchestra based in Bratislava, Slovakia. Its name is derived from the Greek name for Bratislava, Istropolis (city on the Danube).

The orchestra was formed in 1983, and in 1991 the Bratislava City council appointed the orchestra as the Chamber Orchestra of the City of Bratislava. The current conductor is Christian Brembeck.

References

External links 
Naxos.com Profile
Official homepage of the orchestra 

Slovak orchestras
Culture in Bratislava
Chamber orchestras
Musical groups established in 1983